Dugan is a lunar impact crater that is located on the northern part of the Moon's far side. It lies to the southwest of the large walled plain Schwarzschild, and due north of the crater Compton.

This is a heavily worn and eroded crater with an outer wall that forms an irregular ring of peaks and valleys surrounding the relatively featureless interior floor. The crater is now little more than a circular depression in the rugged lunar terrain. The crater features have a softened appearance, possibly due to overlying ejecta from the much larger Schwarzschild and Compton impacts.

Satellite craters
By convention these features are identified on lunar maps by placing the letter on the side of the crater midpoint that is closest to Dugan.

References

 
 
 
 
 
 
 
 
 
 
 
 

Impact craters on the Moon